Long Branch Dam is a dam in Macon County in northern Missouri, about eighty miles north of Columbia, Missouri.

The dam is a project of the United States Army Corps of Engineers to provide flood control, water storage, wildlife conservation, and recreation.  Completed in 1978, the 71-foot-high earthen dam impounds the water of the East Fork of the Little Chariton River.

Long Branch Lake is the reservoir created by the dam, with about 24 miles of shoreline and a flood-control capacity of 98,000 acre-feet.  In addition to the adjacent state-run Long Branch State Park with three separate units, the dam has a visitor's center at its southern end, and the Atlanta State Wildlife Area at its northern end.

References 

Dams in Missouri
Reservoirs in Missouri
United States Army Corps of Engineers dams
Bodies of water of Macon County, Missouri
Dams completed in 1978